The Composers' Publishing Company was a Tin Pan Alley music publishing company incorporated in New York in 1904 by directors Alfred Baldwin Sloane, Irvin M. Hellig, and A. Merrill.

History 
The company bears a similar name as Authors' and Composers' Publishing Company. Sloane, at his death in 1925, was vice president of Authors' and Composers' Publishing Company and president of Composers' Publishing Company.  In 1901, Marcus Witmark prevailed in winning a court injunction against Authors' and Composers' Publishing Company to cease publishing and selling of Sloane's works.  Witmark averred that Sloane had a contract with his firm, M. Witmark & Sons.

Selected publications 
Composers' Publishing Company, New York
 A Wise Old Owl (in A flat major), lyrics by Frederic Ranken, music by Sloane (1904) 
 That Day and You, poem by Estelle Merrymon Clark, music by Palmer John Clark (1913)

References 

Composers
Publishing companies based in New York City
Publishing companies established in 1904
1904 establishments in New York City